is a Japanese series of children's books by writer Rieko Nakagawa and illustrator Yuriko Yamawaki.  The protagonists are two anthropomorphic field mice, and the series began in 1963 with the first volume Guri and Gura. The series is published by Fukuinkan Shoten in Japan.

Overview

The stories tell of the encounters of twin anthropomorphic field mice, Guri and Gura.  Yamawaki accompanies Nakagawa's loosely structured narratives with simple, unsophisticated illustrations.  The stories aim at entertaining rather that instructing and thus do not feature moral dilemmas to be overcome.

Publication and reception

The first volume of the series, titled Guri and Gura, appeared in the children's magazine Kodomo no Tomo in 1963.  The series' writer Rieko Nakagawa worked in childcare at the time.  As of 2014, the first volume had sold over four million copies, and the series had sold a combined 24.9 million copies worldwide.

The first English of Guri and Gura appeared in Britain in 1967; in this translation the castella cake the mice make in the original Japanese becomes a sponge cake more familiar to a British audience.  An translation appeared in 1991 under the subtitle The Giant Egg, by an uncredited translator.  Later translations have been by Peter Howlett and Richard McNamara.  Dozens of other translations have appeared, including Korean, French, Portuguese, Thai, and Esperanto.

List of translated volumes

 Guri and Gura: The Giant Egg
 Guri and Gura
 Guri and Gura's Surprise Visitor
 Guri and Gura's Seaside Adventure
 Guri and Gura's Picnic Adventure
 Guri and Gura's Magical Friend
 Guri and Gura's Playtime Book of Seasons
 Guri and Gura's Special Gift
 Guri and Gura's Spring Cleaning
 Guri and Gura's Songs of the Seasons

Notes

References

Works cited

 
 
 
 
 

Japanese children's literature
Japanese picture books
Japanese fiction
Adventure fiction
Drama by medium
Fantasy books
Series of children's books
Japanese-language books
Books about mice and rats
Twins in fiction
Anthropomorphic animals
Literary duos
Children's books about friendship
Japan in fiction
Forests in fiction
Book series introduced in 1963